Rice Lake Regional Airport  is a city owned public use airport located five nautical miles (9 km) southwest of the central business district of Rice Lake, a city in Barron County, Wisconsin, United States. The airport is situated in the village of Cameron. It is included in the Federal Aviation Administration (FAA) National Plan of Integrated Airport Systems for 2021–2025, in which it is categorized as a local general aviation facility.

Opened in 1995, it was named Carl's Field for Carl Rindlisbacher, the longtime manager of Arrowhead field, one of Rice Lake's previous airports.

Although most U.S. airports use the same three-letter location identifier for the FAA and IATA, this airport is assigned RPD by the FAA and RIE by the IATA.

Facilities and aircraft
It has two asphalt paved runways: 1/19 is 6,700 by 100 feet (2,042 x 30 m) and ILS equipped; 13/31 is 3,500 by 75 feet (1,067 x 23 m).

RICE LAKE (RPD) VOR/DME, 110.0 MHz, is located on field.

Rice Lake Air Center is the fixed-base operator.

For the 12-month period ending July 23, 2020, the airport had 27,650 aircraft operations, an average of 76 per day: 90% general aviation, 10% air taxi and less than 1% military. In January 2023, there were 34 aircraft based at this airport: 27 single-engine, 3 multi-engine, 2 jet and 2 helicopter.

Cargo

See also
List of airports in Wisconsin

References

External links
 Rice Lake Regional Airport at Wisconsin DOT Airport Directory
 Rice Lake Air Center, the airport's fixed-base operator
 

Airports in Wisconsin
Buildings and structures in Barron County, Wisconsin